The canton of Dieppe-2 is an administrative division of the Seine-Maritime department, in northern France. It was created at the French canton reorganisation which came into effect in March 2015. Its seat is in Dieppe.

It consists of the following communes:

Ancourt
Arques-la-Bataille 
Bailly-en-Rivière
Bellengreville
Dampierre-Saint-Nicolas
Dieppe (partly)
Douvrend
Envermeu
Freulleville
Grèges
Les Ifs
Martin-Église
Meulers
Notre-Dame-d'Aliermont
Petit-Caux
Ricarville-du-Val
Saint-Aubin-le-Cauf
Saint-Jacques-d'Aliermont
Saint-Nicolas-d'Aliermont
Saint-Ouen-sous-Bailly
Saint-Vaast-d'Équiqueville
Sauchay

References

Cantons of Seine-Maritime
Dieppe